The Ziyang Bridge is a historic stone arch bridge over the  in the town of Huicheng, She County, Anhui, China.

Etymology
Ziyang Bridge is named for its proximity to Ziyang Mountain in the west.

History
The bridge traces its origins to the former "Shoumin Bridge", founded by magistrates of Huizhou between 1606 and 1614 in the late Ming dynasty (1368–1644).

In June 2012, it has been designated as a provincial-level cultural heritage site by the Government of Anhui.

Gallery

References

Bridges in Anhui
Arch bridges in China
Bridges completed in 1614
Ming dynasty architecture
Buildings and structures completed in 1614
1614 establishments in China